Adal may refer to:

A short form for Germanic names in aþala- (Old High German adal-), "nobility, pedigree"; see Othalan
Adál Maldonado (1948-2020), Puerto Rican artist
Adal Ramones (born 1969), Mexican television show host
Adal Hernandez (born 1973), American tattoo artist
Adal Island, Malaysia
Scandinavian Ådal (Old Norse Árdalr), "river valley":
Ådal, valley and former municipality in Buskerud county, Norway
Illerup Ådal, archeological site in Denmark
Arabic  ʿadl, "justice":
Adal (historical region), former geographic region in Northeast Africa
Adal Sultanate, former sultanate in Northeast Africa
The Arabic name of Awdal, a region in northwestern Somaliland
Adal (sheep), breed of sheep from Ethiopia
FC Adal Asmara, football team from Eritrea
Adal, Iran, a village in the Lorestan Province
 Adal was a political party in Kazakhstan.